Madeleine Zimmer (born 28 September 2001) is a field hockey player from the United States, who plays as a midfielder and forward.

Personal life
Madeleine Zimmer was born in Owatonna, Minnesota and raised in Hershey, Pennsylvania.

Zimmer is a student at Northwestern University.

Career

Club hockey
Madeleine Zimmer is a former player for the Alley Cats hockey team.

Junior national team
Zimmer made her debut for the United States U–21 team in 2019, during a test series against Germany, held in Viersen and Mönchengladbach.

She followed this up with an appearance at the 2021 Pan American Junior Championship in Santiago.

Senior national team
Following her debut for the junior national team, Zimmer made her senior debut later that year during a test series against Canada in Lancaster.

She is currently in the senior national squad.

References

External links

2001 births
Living people
American female field hockey players
Female field hockey midfielders
Female field hockey forwards
People from Hershey, Pennsylvania
21st-century American women